Jaggu is a 1975 Bollywood crime film directed by Samir Ganguly.

Cast
Azaad Irani (as Azad)
Indira Bansal
Master Bhagwan ...  Qawal
Leena Chandavarkar ...  Geeta
Mohan Choti ...  Pandit
Hercules
Anwar Hussain ...  Desai
Imtiaz ...  Kaalia
Aruna Irani ...  Courtesan
Jagdeep ...  Birju
Jyoti ...  Sayeeda
Viju Khote ...  Baniya
Paintal ...  Nandu Khade
Purnima ...  Geeta's mom
Shivraj ...  Kedar
Nipon Goswami
Shatrughan Sinha ...  Jagtap aka 'Jaggu'
Bindu ...  Cabaret Dancer

Music
"Pyaar Me Tere Piya Aisa Thadpa Hai Jiya" - Lata Mangeshkar
"Chanda Kiran Pyaasi Hai" - Asha Bhosle
"Mere Naam Ka Chala Hai Yeh Jaam" - Asha Bhosle
"Kasme Dekhe Vaade Dekhe" - Asha Bhosle
"Mere Dum Se Chand Tare" - Aziz Nazan, Narendra Chanchal, Kumar Sonik
"Meri Payal Chanke Chanak" - Lata Mangeshkar

External links
 

1975 films
1970s Hindi-language films
1975 crime films
Indian crime films
Films scored by Sonik-Omi
Films directed by Samir Ganguly
Hindi-language crime films